Magda Mihalache (born 6 July 1981) is a retired Romanian tennis player.

In May 2005, she reached her highest WTA ranking of 176 in singles whilst her best doubles ranking was 120 in November 1999. She was coached by Dietmar Rau. Mihalache won five singles and twelve doubles titles on the ITF Women's Circuit.

Playing for Romania at the Fed Cup, Mihalache has a win–loss record of 7–5.

ITF finals

Singles (5–10)

Doubles (12–15)

External links
 
 
 

1981 births
Living people
Sportspeople from Brăila
Romanian female tennis players